Jean-Pierre Teisseire (born 31 August 1940) is a French politician. Teisseire entered local politics as a member of the Union for French Democracy party and later the Union for a Popular Movement.  Teisseire's son Antonin became a champion poker player.

References

1940 births
Living people
French footballers
Ligue 1 players
AC Ajaccio players
Grenoble Foot 38 players
OGC Nice players
Olympique Lyonnais players
Stade de Reims players

Association football defenders
Pays d'Aix FC players